Bastrop High School is a public high school in Bastrop, Texas (USA) the UIL classifies as a 5A school. It is part of the Bastrop Independent School District located in central Bastrop County. In 2015, the school was rated "Met Standard" by the Texas Education Agency.

Communities served
The school serves the City of Bastrop, Camp Swift, Circle D-KC Estates, and Paige.

Athletics
The Bastrop Bears compete in these sports - 

Baseball
Basketball
Cross Country
Football
Golf
Powerlifting
Soccer
Softball
Tennis
Track and Field
Volleyball
Marching Band

State Titles
Boys Golf - 
1958(B), 1964(1A)
Girls Golf - 
1993(4A), 1994(4A), 1995(4A)
One Act Play - 
1978(2A)

Alumni
Corey Knebel, All-Star MLB player, attended freshmen through junior year
Billy Waugh, 1947, U.S. Army Special Forces soldier and Central Intelligence Agency paramilitary operations officer

References

External links
Bastrop ISD

Public high schools in Texas
Schools in Bastrop County, Texas